Filip Flisar (born 28 September 1987) is a retired Slovenian freestyle skier who competed in ski cross discipline.

Career

Alpine skiing career 

Flisar started his career as an alpine skier in fast disciplines. He competed at two World Junior Alpine Skiing Championships and a couple of FIS Ski European Cup events, but had no notable success.

2008: Freestyle skiing career 

Flisar joined the FIS Freestyle Skiing World Cup in 2008. His World Cup debut performance in the 2007–08 season was a ski cross competition on 6 March 2008 in Grindelwald, Switzerland where he did not receive any points. In the 2008–09 season he also competed in his first and also the only half-pipe World Cup event.

2010: First Olympics 

He represented Slovenia at the 2010 Winter Olympics in Vancouver, where he competed in ski cross and finished in eighth place. At the 2011 FIS Freestyle World Ski Championships in Deer Valley, where he competed in men's ski cross, he finished in eleventh place.

2012: Winter X Games medal 

In 2012, at the Winter X Games XVI in Aspen, he achieved second place in the ski cross event.

2012: Ski Cross title 

On 11 January 2012 in Alpe d'Huez he won his first World Cup victory. He won a total of three World Cup races in that season. In the 2011–12 season he won the discipline title in ski cross and was fifth in overall ranking.

2014: Olympics  

In Sochi At 2014 Winter Olympics he competed in men's ski cross where he reached the semi finals. In the small final he placed second, behind Egor Korotkov and ahead of Armin Niederer and Florian Eigler, thus ranking overall sixth in the competition.

2015: Ski Cross World Champion 

On 25 January 2015 he produced a stunning performance in the final of FIS Freestyle Ski and Snowboarding World Championships 2015 ski cross and managed to climb from third to first place in the last few meters of the race. He won his and Slovenia's first ever gold medal at the World Championship in Freestyle skiing. He shared the podium with Jean-Frédéric Chapuis, defending World and Olympic Champion, who won the silver medal and Victor Öhling Norberg, who got bronze.

2016: Mountain bike racing career 

He achieved tenth place in men's four-cross at the 2016 World Championships in Val di Sole.

World Cup

Standings

Wins

References 
General

Specific

External links

 

1987 births
Living people
Sportspeople from Maribor
Slovenian male freestyle skiers
Olympic freestyle skiers of Slovenia
Freestyle skiers at the 2010 Winter Olympics
Freestyle skiers at the 2014 Winter Olympics
Freestyle skiers at the 2018 Winter Olympics
X Games athletes